The Elements is an album by the American saxophonist Joe Henderson, released in 1974 on Milestone. The musicians included violinist Michael White, bassist Charlie Haden, drummer Leon Chancler, percussionist Kenneth Nash, and featured guest Alice Coltrane on keyboards & harp.

Track listing
All songs were composed by Joe Henderson.
Side one
"Fire" - 11:08
"Air"- 9:50

Side two
"Water" - 7:31
"Earth" - 13:07

Recorded on October 15 (2-3) and 17 (1, 4), 1973.

Personnel
Joe Henderson - tenor sax, flute, alto flute
Alice Coltrane - piano, harp, tanpura, harmonium
Michael White - violin
Charlie Haden - bass
Leon "Ndugu" Chancler - drums (1, 4)
Kenneth Nash - congas, North African Sakara drum, bells, gong, percussion, flute (3), narrator (4)
Baba Duru Oshun  - tabla, percussion

References

Milestone Records albums
Joe Henderson albums
1974 albums